Miskatonic University is a fictional university located in Arkham, a fictional town in Essex County, Massachusetts. It is named after the Miskatonic River (also fictional). After first appearing in H. P. Lovecraft's 1922 story "Herbert West–Reanimator", the school appeared in numerous Cthulhu Mythos stories by Lovecraft and other writers. The story "The Dunwich Horror" implies that Miskatonic University is a highly prestigious university, on par with Harvard University, and that Harvard and Miskatonic are the two most popular schools for the children of the Massachusetts "Old Gentry". The university also appears in role-playing games and board games based on the mythos.

Origin

Lovecraft concocted the word Miskatonic from a mixture of root words from the Algonquian languages. Place-names based on the Algonquian languages are common throughout New England. Anthony Pearsall believes that Lovecraft based the name on the Housatonic River which extends from the Long Island Sound through the Berkshires of Western Massachusetts and western Connecticut.

Daniel Harms suggests that Miskatonic is derived from the Misqat, a tribe descended from the Native Americans of Massachusetts.

Campus

Miskatonic University is modeled on the northeastern Ivy League universities of Lovecraft's day, perhaps Brown University of his hometown Providence which Lovecraft himself wished to attend. In Lovecraft's stories, the university's student body is implied to be all-male, much like northeastern universities of Lovecraft's time. The only female student mentioned is Asenath Waite, of Lovecraft's "The Thing on the Doorstep" (1937).

To represent Miskatonic University in their film adaptation of The Whisperer in Darkness in 2009, the H. P. Lovecraft Historical Society chose Mount Holyoke College. The film uses Pasadena City College for interior scenes of the school. Alan Moore's 2015–2017 comic Providence used Saint Anselm College as the "real" Miskatonic University.

Miskatonic University is famous for its collection of occult books. The library holds one of the very few genuine copies of the Necronomicon. Other tomes include Unaussprechlichen Kulten by Friedrich von Junzt and the fragmentary Book of Eibon.

Miskatonic's medical school features in "Herbert West—Reanimator".

Miskatonic University was also featured in the fifth episode of Netflix's 2022 anthology television series Guillermo del Toro's Cabinet of Curiosities entitled "Pickman's Model" starring Ben Barnes.

Interpretations by other authors and fans differ as to whether mystical and Mythos studies at the University are covert or overt.  In the first interpretation, which follows Lovecraftian literary traditions, Miskatonic University is an apparently ordinary school whose occult undercurrent only occasionally breaks the surface. In the second, more common in comedic and RPG works (and in Miskatonic University paraphernalia), Mythos and strange elements are overtly displayed and form part of its campus identity.

Faculty

Lovecraft's work
The following table lists the professors of Miskatonic University and their respective departments from Lovecraft's stories.

Other authors' work

Reference guides
Chaosium Press published several guides to the 1920s Miskatonic University.  The first was a lengthy section in 'Arkham Unveiled' (1990) by Keith Herber with others and put a full university setting around existing Cthulhu Mythos references. The second was Miskatonic University (1995), a full-length book by Sandy Antunes.  Subtitled 'Where Science Meets the Mythos', this edition tried to merge and reconcile the Chaosium setting of 'Arkham Unveiled', the original Mythos sources, and historical 'period' details derived especially from 1920s Boston University, while also adding new items to the setting.  A copy of this out-of-print book is in Boston University's special collections archive, and Chaosium granted rights in 1997 to the Miskatonic University website to reuse some of this material for their website. The third was a new edition of 'Miskatonic University' (2005) by 'Sam Johnson & friends' published in late 2005.  This edition reworked the previous book and added more mystical and mythos game elements.

Notes

References
 

Cthulhu Mythos locations
Cthulhu Mythos organizations
Fictional American universities and colleges
Massachusetts in fiction
Fictional elements introduced in 1922